Scirpophaga terrella is a moth in the family Crambidae. It is found in Paraná, Brazil.

The wingspan is about 34 mm. The wings are dull yellowish brown, irrorated (speckled) with fuscous.

References

Moths described in 1896
Schoenobiinae
Moths of South America